Georgy Tikhonovich Krutikov (1899–1958) was a Russian constructivist architect and artist, noted for his Flying City.

Selected works
1928 – Flying city project

External links
The Flying City Project

References

1899 births
1958 deaths
Constructivist architects
Russian architects
Modernist architects
Russian avant-garde
Russian artists